Elena Anatolyevna Mikhaylichenko (born 15 September 2001) is a Russian handball player for CSKA Moscow and the Russian national handball team.

Mikhaylichenko was top scorer for Russia at both Hungary 2018 (45 goals) and Poland 2018 (44), with almost all her goals scored from her preferred position of left back.

In September 2018, she was included by EHF in a list of the twenty best young handballers to watch for the future.

Achievements
Olympic Games:
Silver Medalist: 2020
World Championship:
Bronze Medalist: 2019

Youth World Championship:
Gold Medalist: 2018

Individual awards  
 Most Valuable Player of the Youth World Championship: 2018
 Most Valuable Player of the Junior European Championship: 2019

References

External links

2001 births
Living people
Sportspeople from Tolyatti
Russian female handball players
Handball players at the 2020 Summer Olympics
Medalists at the 2020 Summer Olympics
Olympic medalists in handball
Olympic silver medalists for the Russian Olympic Committee athletes